The Los Angeles Chargers are a professional American football team in the National Football League (NFL) based in the Los Angeles Area. The club began play in 1960 as a charter member of the American Football League (AFL), and spent its first season in Los Angeles before moving to San Diego in 1961. They returned to Los Angeles in 2017. The Chargers created their Hall of Fame in 1976. Eligible candidates for the Hall of Fame must have been retired for at least four seasons. Selections are made by a five-member committee chaired by Dean Spanos, Chargers vice-chairman. As of 1992, other committee members included Bob Breitbard, founder of the San Diego Hall of Champions; Ron Fowler, president of the Greater San Diego Sports Association; Jane Rappoport, president of the Charger Backers; and Bill Johnston, the team's director of public relations.

The initial four members—former players Emil Karas, Frank Buncom, Bob Laraba, and Jacque MacKinnon—were inducted posthumously in 1976. From 1986 through 1992, there were no new inductions. The Los Angeles Times wrote in 1992, "The Chargers have not done a good job in recent years of recognizing their former players." Dan Fouts and Charlie Joiner were inducted in 1993. "It embarrasses me to go into the Hall of Fame before Don Coryell, because if it wasn't for Don Coryell, I wouldn't be in the Hall of Fame for the Chargers," said Fouts of his former head coach. Coryell was inducted the following year. The Chargers allowed the 2012 inductee to be determined by fans, who selected punter Darren Bennett.

The members of the Hall of Fame were honored in San Diego at the Chargers Ring of Honor, viewable above the visiting team's sideline of Qualcomm Stadium on the press level. It was founded in 2000 as part of the team's season-long celebration of its 40th anniversary. Before its introduction that season, the Chargers and the Oakland Raiders were the only NFL teams without a Ring of Honor. In 2013, the Chargers also inducted their 1963 AFL Championship team into their Ring of Honor; 15 members of that team were already in the team's Hall of Fame.

Key

Hall of Fame inductees

See also
San Diego Chargers 40th Anniversary Team
San Diego Chargers 50th Anniversary Team

References

American football museums and halls of fame
Los Angeles Chargers Hall of Fame
Hall of Fame
Halls of fame in California
Awards established in 1976
1976 establishments in California